Jakob Lestschinsky (also Jacob Lestschinsky, Yankev Leshtshinski, Yankev Leshchinski, לשצ'ינסקי, יעקב; August 26, 1876 in Horodysche, Ukraine – March 22, 1966 in Jerusalem) was a Jewish statistician and sociologist who wrote in Yiddish, German, and English.  He specialized in Jewish demography and economic history. And during the February Revolution in Russia he helped found the United Jewish Socialist Party and served on the editorial board of Naye Tsayt, its official journal.And in 1938 he went to the United States. During the war he lived in New York, and worked with the Institute of Jewish Affairs of the World Jewish Congress.

Life
Born near Kyiv, he received a traditional Jewish education. As a teenager, he was deeply moved by Hebrew writer Ahad Ha'am. After university study in Switzerland for a decade, he returned to Russia in 1913. He was involved in various Zionist and socialist political activities, such as the Zionist Socialist Workers Party.

After being imprisoned in the aftermath of the October Revolution, he left Russia in 1921 for Berlin.  There he was a correspondent for the New York Yiddish daily Forverts, a role he continued for more than 40 years. He left Germany for Warsaw in 1934, emigrated to the United States in 1938, and finally to Israel in 1959. And Lestschinsky jacob sent a dispatch to Forward which was published in the New York Times on March 26, 1933; in it he said: "The Hitler regime flames up with anger because it has been compelled through fear of public foreign opinion to forego a mass slaughter of Jews.

YIVO
He was a founding member of YIVO (Institute for Jewish Research) in Vilna (then in Poland), starting its Section for Economics and Statistics.

Selected works
 Yidishe Folk in Tsifern (1922)
 Jüdische Bevölkerungsbewegung (1926)
 "Die Umsiedlung und Umschichtung des jüdischen Volkes im Laufe des letzten Jahrhunderts" (1929), Weltwirtschaftliches Archiv, 30: 123-156
 Di Yidishe Katastrofe (1944) 
 Crisis, Catastrophe, and Survival: A Jewish Balance Sheet, 1914–1948 (1948)

References

Ukrainian Jews
Demographers
History of YIVO
1876 births
1966 deaths
Zionist Socialist Workers Party politicians
People from Kiev Governorate
Russian expatriates in Switzerland
Russian expatriates in Germany
Russian expatriates in Poland
Jewish emigrants from Nazi Germany to the United States
Prisoners and detainees of the Soviet Union
White Russian emigrants to Germany
American emigrants to Israel